The following is a list of countries by computer exports. Data is for 2014, in millions of United States dollars, as reported by The Observatory of Economic Complexity. Currently the top fifteen countries are listed.

The list does not include Taiwan, due to political reasons. Its number is included in China's, even though China does not control or have influence over Taiwan. Every year, one of three laptops sold in the world is produced by one single Taiwanese company, -- Quanta Computer.

References
atlas.media.mit.edu - Observatory of Economic complexity - Countries that export Computers (2012)

Computer
Computer industry